Opisotretidae is a family of millipedes belonging to the order Polydesmida.

Genera:
 Carlotretus Hoffman, 1980
 Corypholophus Attems, 1938
 Martensodesmus Golovatch, 1987
 Nepalotretus Golovatch, 1987
 Opisotretus Attems, 1907
 Opisthoporodesmus Silvestri, 1899
 Retrodesmus Chamberlin, 1945
 Solaenaulus Attems, 1940

References

Polydesmida